Linda Hayden (born 19 January 1953, Linda M. Higginson) is an English film and television actress. She is best known for her roles in 1970s British horror films and sex comedies.

Career
Hayden was born in Stanmore, Middlesex.  She trained with the Aida Foster stage school in dancing, singing and stage acting before making her film debut at the age of 15 in the controversial Baby Love (1968), playing a schoolgirl who seduces her adoptive family. She next featured in two horror films; playing Alice Hargood in Hammer's Taste the Blood of Dracula, (1970), followed by a memorable performance as the demonically possessed Angel Blake in The Blood on Satan's Claw (1970), made by Tigon.  In 1972, she played a pregnant teenage hitchhiker in Something to Hide, driving Peter Finch to murder and madness.

Hayden appeared opposite Robin Askwith, her then-boyfriend, in the popular sex comedies Confessions of a Window Cleaner (1974), Confessions from a Holiday Camp (1977) and, with Fiona Richmond, in Let's Get Laid (1978); as well as the obscure cult film Queen Kong (1976). She also shared the stage with Askwith, in Richard Harris and Leslie Darbon's farce Who Goes Bare. Hayden and Richmond had previously appeared together in the thriller Exposé (1976), which was known as Trauma in the US and House on Straw Hill in Australia, and banned in the UK as a video nasty. In a documentary on the DVD of The Blood on Satan's Claw, Hayden says that Exposé is the only movie she regrets making and was not the film she had made originally.

Following a brief role in The Boys from Brazil (1978), Hayden concentrated on stage and television work. In 1980 she appeared in the ITV series The Professionals as 'Gerda' in the episode 'Black Out' and as 'Annie,' Terry McCann's girlfriend in the Christmas special Minder on the Orient Express, 1985.
She also took a role in the thriller Underground at Toronto's Royal Alexandra Theatre and London's Prince of Wales Theatre in 1983, as well as a 1997 episode of The Bill.

Now semi-retired, she featured as Mrs Brown in Martin Kemp's 2010 remake of Exposé, with Jane March playing Linda—Hayden's role in the 1976 original.

Personal life
She is the sister of the company actress Jane Hayden (b. 1957), who played a number of roles on films and TV in the 1970s. Hayden was in a relationship with fellow actor and co-star Robin Askwith in the 1970s. She married Paul Elliot in 1987.

Filmography

Film

Television

References and notes

External links

People from Stanmore
English film actresses
English television actresses
1953 births
Living people
Alumni of the Aida Foster Theatre School